The 2021–22 HNK Gorica season was the club's 13th season in existence and the 4th consecutive season in the top flight of Croatian football.

First-team squad

Transfers

In

Source: Glasilo Hrvatskog nogometnog saveza

Out

Source: Glasilo Hrvatskog nogometnog saveza

Total spending:  0 €

Total income:  4,150,000 €

Total expenditure:  4,150,000 €

Competitions

Overview

Prva liga

League table

Results summary

Results by round

Matches

Croatian Football Cup

Player seasonal records
Updated 22 May 2022

Goals

Source: Competitive matches

Clean sheets

Source: Competitive matches

Disciplinary record

Appearances and goals

Notes

References

External links

HNK Gorica seasons
Gorica